Young Girls on a Bridge is the title of twelve works by Edvard Munch produced over the course of his lifetime, particularly between 1886 and 1927. They all show a bridge in Aagaardstrand, a bathing station on the Oslofjord, where the artist spent several summers, a very short season in Norway. Each shows a particular emotion of the artist, with the 1901 version (now in the National Gallery) for instance showing the same composition as that of 1927 but completely different colouring.

Another version was produced for the "salon des indépendants" in Paris in 1903, from which it was bought by Mikhail Morozov - it is now in the Pushkin Museum in Moscow. Another produced in 1902 was bought at Sotheby's New York on 14 November 2016 for $54.5 million by Hasso Plattner.

References 

Paintings by Edvard Munch
1901 paintings
1902 paintings
1927 paintings
Women in art
Paintings in the collection of the Pushkin Museum
Paintings in the collection of the Munch Museum
Paintings in the collection of the National Gallery (Norway)